Kathleen Satchwell, commonly known as Kathy Satchwell, is a judge of the Gauteng Division of the High Court (formerly the South Gauteng High Court) in South Africa.

Biography
She was educated at Rhodes University in the 1960s.

She was a prominent human rights attorney in the 1990s. Satchwell was also involved with court cases of the Mandela United Football Club (MUFC) and of people connected to the killing of Stompie Moeketsi, in the period 1990–1992. She gave evidence before the Truth and Reconciliation Commission on the role of the legal system in contributing to the violations of human rights in South Africa under apartheid. In 1999 she was appointed by President Nelson Mandela to be Chairperson of the Road Accident Fund Commission.

In September 2001 in the case named Satchwell v President of the Republic of South Africa, Satchwell, an open lesbian, won the right for her partner to enjoy the same benefits as those previously reserved for spouses of married heterosexual judges. This right was confirmed by the Constitutional Court in 2002. This decision is seen as one of five key decisions that set the legal status of same-sex couples in South Africa before the legalisation of same-sex marriage.

References

20th-century births
LGBT judges
South African lesbians
Living people
Rhodes University alumni
South African women judges
South African women lawyers
20th-century South African lawyers
21st-century South African lawyers
Year of birth missing (living people)
20th-century women lawyers
21st-century women lawyers